A dun is an ancient or medieval fort. In Ireland and Britain it is mainly a kind of hillfort and also a kind of Atlantic roundhouse.

Etymology 
The term comes from Irish dún or Scottish Gaelic dùn (meaning "fort"), and is cognate with Old Welsh din (whence Welsh dinas "city" comes).

In certain instances, place-names containing Dun- or similar in Northern England and Southern Scotland, may be derived from a Brittonic cognate of the Welsh form din. In this region, substitution of the Brittonic form by the Gaelic equivalent may have been widespread in toponyms.

The Dacian dava (hill fort) is probably etymologically cognate.

Details 
In some areas duns were built on any suitable crag or hillock, particularly south of the Firth of Clyde and the Firth of Forth. There are many duns on the west coast of Ireland and they feature in Irish mythology. For example, the tale of the Táin Bó Flidhais features Dún Chiortáin and Dún Chaocháin.

Duns seem to have arrived with the Celts in about the 7th century BC. Early duns had near vertical ramparts made of stone and timber. There were two walls, an inner wall and the outside one. Vitrified forts are the remains of duns that have been set on fire and where stones have been partly melted. Use of duns continued in some parts into the Middle Ages.

Duns are similar to brochs, but are smaller and probably would not have been capable of supporting a very tall structure. Good examples of this kind of dun can be found in the Outer Hebrides of Scotland, on artificial islands in small lakes.

Toponymy 
The word dun is, along with like-sounding cognate forms, an element frequently found in Celtic toponymy; especially that of Ireland and Scotland. It can include fortifications of all sizes and kinds:

Ireland 
 Donegal
 Doneraile
 Down
 Dún Laoghaire
 Dún an Ri (Kingscourt), County Cavan
 Dundalk
 Dundonald
 Dundrum, County Down
 Dundrum, Dublin
 Dungannon
 Dungarvan
 Dunmurry
 Portadown

Scotland 
Many settlement and geographical names in Scotland are named with Gaelic dun ("fort"), as well as cognates in Brittonic languages such as Cumbric and Pictish.

 Drumpellier, Lanarkshire
 Dumbarton, Dunbartonshire
 Dumfries, Dumfriesshire – possibly Brittonic din-pres ("thicket fort").
 Dundee, Angus
 Dunearn, Nairnshire 
 Dunearn, Fife – possibly dùn-Èirinn ("fort of Ireland").
 Dunfermline, Fife
 Duniface, Fife – possibly Pictish equivalent of Welsh din-y-faes ("fort of the field").
 Dunimarle, Fife
 Dunino, Fife
 Dunipace, Stirlingshire - Brittonic equivalent of Welsh din-y-bas ("fort of the shallow").
 Dunlop, Ayrshire
 Duns, Berwickshire
 Duntarvie, West Lothian
 Tantallon, East Lothian
 Edinburgh, - Name in Scottish Gaelic is Dun Eideann.

England 
Some place-names in England are derived from Brittonic cognates of Welsh din (c.f. Cornish dyn, Cumbric *din), and fewer perhaps from the Gaelic form. Roman-era toponyms ending in -dunum may represent an ancient Brittonic *duno.

 Cambodunum, Yorkshire
 Din Guoaroy, Northumberland – obsolete name for Bamburgh. Equivalent to Welsh din-gwarae ("fort of the play").
 Dinckley, Lancashire
 Dunmallard Hill, Cumberland
 Durham, County Durham - Dunelm
 Glendinning Rigg, Cumberland
 Londesborough, Yorkshire – Lugudunum, from *lọ:co- + duno ("shining fort").
 Rigodunum, Lancashire
 Segedunum, Northumberland 
 Tintagel, Cornwall
 Uxelodunum, Cumberland – c.f. Welsh ucheldin ("high fort").

London has been etymologised as Brittonic *lin- + dun- ("lake fort"). Coates has rejected such an etymology as "incompatible with early forms".

Wales 
 Carmarthen, Carmarthenshire – Moridunum ("sea fort").
 Denbigh, Denbighshire – from dinbych ("small fort")
 Tintern, Monmouthshire

Italy 
 Duno
 Induno Olona
 Verduno

France and Switzerland 

The Proto-Celtic form is *Dūno-, yielding Greek δοῦνον. It is ultimately cognate to English town. The Gaulish term survives in many toponyms in France and Switzerland:
 Autun - Augustodūnon fort of Augustus
 Lyon – Lugudūnon "Lugus' fort"
 Nevers – Nouiodūnon "new fort"
 Olten – Ol(l)odūnonm "fort on the Olon river"
 Thun – Dūnon 
 Verdun – Uerodūnon "strong fort"
 Yverdon-les-Bains – Eburodūnon "yew fort"

Germany 
 Kempten, Bavaria – Cambodunum

Bulgaria and Serbia 
 Dunonia
 Singidunum

Elsewhere in the world 
 Dunedin, New Zealand – from Dùn Èideann, the Gaelic name for Edinburgh.
 Dunedin, Florida, USA – see Dunedin, New Zealand.

See also 
Prehistoric Scotland
Dun cow

References 

 Scotland Before History - Stuart Piggott, Edinburgh University Press 1982, 
 Scotland's Hidden History - Ian Armit, Tempus (in association with Historic Scotland) 1998, 

Fortifications in the United Kingdom
Geography of Scotland
Place name element etymologies
Archaeology of Scotland
Toponymy
Fortifications by type
Fortifications in Ireland